Trollabhal (also known as Trallval) (702 m) is a mountain in the island of Rùm in Lochaber, Scotland.

Although the lowest of the 'Rum Cuillin' in the south of the Island, Trollabhal is one of the finest peaks in the range. Climbers have to navigate a narrow arête of bare rock in order to reach the summit. Scrambling is also required on both ridges.

References

Marilyns of Scotland
Grahams
Mountains and hills of the Scottish islands
Mountains and hills of Highland (council area)
Rùm